MacCallum is a Scottish surname or given name. Notable people with the name include:

 James MacCallum Smith (1868–1939), Australian politician, newspaper proprietor and stock breeder
 MacCallum Grant (1845–1928), Canadian businessman
 MacCallum Scott (1874–1928), Scottish politician
 Martha MacCallum (born 1964), American news anchor
 Mungo Wentworth MacCallum (1941–2020), Australian journalist
 Mungo William MacCallum (1854–1942), Chancellor of the University of Sydney
 Spencer MacCallum (21st century), American anthropologist
 Taber MacCallum (21st century), one of the original crewmembers of Biosphere 2
 William George MacCallum (1874–1944), Canadian physician

See also
 Clan MacCallum
 Kellie-MacCallum
 McCallum (disambiguation)

Scottish given names